Acrosynanthus is a genus of flowering plants in the family Rubiaceae. It is found in Cuba and Jamaica in the Caribbean.

Species

 Acrosynanthus jamaicensis Howard & Proctor - Jamaica
 Acrosynanthus latifolius Standl. - eastern Cuba
 Acrosynanthus ovatus Urb.  - eastern Cuba
 Acrosynanthus parvifolius Britton ex Standl. - eastern Cuba
 Acrosynanthus revolutus Urb. - eastern Cuba
 Acrosynanthus trachyphyllus Standl. - Cuba

External links
World Checklist of Rubiaceae

Rubiaceae genera
Rondeletieae